Ivona Bogoje (born 31 October 1976 in Dubrovnik, SFR Yugoslavia) is a Croatian female basketball player.

External links
Profile at eurobasket.com
Profile ISM Basket agency site

1976 births
Living people
People from Dubrovnik
Croatian women's basketball players
Centers (basketball)
ŽKK Partizan players
ŽKK Gospić players